The 2018–19 season was Genoa Cricket and Football Club's twelfth consecutive season in Serie A. The club competed in Serie A and in the Coppa Italia.

The season was coach Davide Ballardini's first full campaign in charge, after taking over from the sacked Ivan Jurić during the 2017–18 season.

Players

Squad information
Appearances include league matches only

Transfers

In

Loans in

Out

Loans out

Competitions

Serie A

League table

Results summary

Results by round

Matches

Coppa Italia

Statistics

Appearances and goals

|-
! colspan=14 style=background:#dcdcdc; text-align:center| Goalkeepers

|-
! colspan=14 style=background:#dcdcdc; text-align:center| Defenders

|-
! colspan=14 style=background:#dcdcdc; text-align:center| Midfielders

|-
! colspan=14 style=background:#dcdcdc; text-align:center| Forwards

|-
! colspan=14 style=background:#dcdcdc; text-align:center| Players transferred out during the season

Goalscorers

Last updated: 26 May 2019

Clean sheets

Last updated: 26 May 2019

Disciplinary record

Last updated: 26 May 2019

References

Genoa C.F.C. seasons
Genoa